One Swallow Does Not Make a Summer is a 1947 Swedish comedy film directed by Hasse Ekman. The film starrs Eva Henning, Hasse Ekman, Sonja Wigert and Lauritz Falk.

Cast
Eva Henning as Inga Brantemo, secretary
Hasse Ekman as Bertil Brantemo, writer, Inga's husband 
Sonja Wigert as Christina "Chris" Lovén 
Lauritz Falk as Berger 
Olof Winnerstrand as Lovén, Chris's father 
Katie Rolfsen as Agnes Karlsson, maid 
Douglas Håge as Granlund
Margit Andelius as Miss Santesson
Gunnar Björnstrand as a modernist writer 
Ulla Andreasson as Bettan, Bertil's sister 
Gull Natorp as Mrs. Andersson 
Charlie Almlöf as Oskar Andersson
Astrid Bodin as Mrs. Lundgren

External links

1947 films
Films directed by Hasse Ekman
1940s Swedish-language films
Swedish comedy films
1947 comedy films
Swedish black-and-white films
1940s Swedish films